The fourth and final season of The Cleveland Show aired on the Fox network from October 7, 2012, to May 19, 2013. On May 9, 2011, Fox announced that the series had been renewed for a fourth season. Guest stars for the season included George Clinton, Nick Offerman, Dale Earnhardt Jr., Shorty Rossi, Kasey Kahne and Tony Stewart.  On May 13, 2013, Fox announced that they would not be renewing The Cleveland Show for another season, making this one the final season. The series ended with the episode "Wheel! Of! Family!" on May 19, 2013. In August 2013, series creator Seth MacFarlane announced that Cleveland would be moving back to Quahog along with the Tubbs family to rejoin the Family Guy cast.

Cast and characters

 Mike Henry as Cleveland Brown and Rallo Tubbs
 Sanaa Lathan as Donna Tubbs Brown
 Reagan Gomez-Preston as Roberta Tubbs
 Kevin Michael Richardson as Cleveland Brown Jr.

Episode list

Home media

References

External links
 The Cleveland Show Renewed For Season 4

2012 American television seasons
2013 American television seasons
4